Flodday is an uninhabited island, south west of Barra in the Western Islands of Scotland.

Geography and geology
It consists of three parts, with a natural rock arch between the larger two. Facing west there are black cliffs.

Wildlife
The island has a small grey seal colony and is home to a subspecies of the dark green fritillary butterfly (Argynnis aglaja scotica).

Notes and references

Barra Isles
Clan MacNeil
Uninhabited islands of the Outer Hebrides
Natural arches of Scotland